Bodybuilding at the 2005 Southeast Asian Games was held at the Government Service Insurance System Theater in Pasay, Philippines. This sport is not included in the Olympic Games but is included as one of the events in the SEA Games since 2003.

As a sport, called competitive bodybuilding, bodybuilders display their physiques to a panel of judges, who assign points based on their aesthetic appearance.

Medal table

Medalists

Men

External links
Southeast Asian Games Official Results

2005 Southeast Asian Games events
2005
Bodybuilding competitions in the Philippines
Southeast Asian Games